Polycal can refer to:

 An ultra fine form of calcium oxide used as a desiccant.
 A commercial polymer of glucose used as an energy supplement.